John Tweed (21 January 1869 – 12 November 1933) was a Scottish sculptor.

Early life
John Tweed was born at 16 Great Portland Street, Glasgow and studied at the Glasgow School of Art. He then trained with Hamo Thornycroft in London, and attended the Royal Academy Schools at the same time. Together, they created the frieze on the Institute of Chartered Accountants' building in London. In 1893 he moved to Paris with the hope of studying with Auguste Rodin; this proved impossible as Rodin would only accept pupils who would spend four years under his supervision.

Personal life
In 1895, he married Edith Clinton, secretary to the National Society for Women's Suffrage, the first national group in the UK to campaign for women's right to vote. Also in 1895, they moved into 108 Cheyne Walk, Chelsea, London, and Tweed lived there until his death in 1933 aged 64.

Legacy
The first major exhibition of Tweed's work since 1934 ran from March to September 2013 at the Sir John Madejski Art Gallery, Reading Museum, Reading, England. The Victoria and Albert Museum have called him the "British Rodin".

References

1869 births
1933 deaths
19th-century British sculptors
20th-century British sculptors
19th-century Scottish artists
20th-century Scottish artists
Alumni of the Glasgow School of Art
Artists from Glasgow
Scottish male sculptors
19th-century Scottish male artists
20th-century Scottish male artists